Glyphipterix syndecta is a species of sedge moth in the genus Glyphipterix. It was described by Edward Meyrick in 1915. It is found in Peru.

References

Moths described in 1915
Glyphipterigidae
Moths of South America